Daniel Fischbuch (born 19 August 1993 in Bad Friedrichshall) is a German professional ice hockey player. He is currently under contract with his original club, Düsseldorfer EG, in the Deutsche Eishockey Liga (DEL).

Playing career
Born in Bad Friedrichshall, Fischbach played in the youth ranks of Heilbronn, Bietigheim, Mannheim und Bad Nauheim before joining the youth team of Düsseldorfer EG in 2009. He made his debut for Düsseldorf in Germany's top flight Deutsche Eishockey Liga (DEL) during the 2011-12 season. Over the years, he established himself as a vital member of the Düsseldorf team.

In April 2016, he penned a deal with fellow DEL outfit Eisbären Berlin.

Career statistics

International

References

External links
 

1993 births
Living people
DEG Metro Stars players
Düsseldorfer EG players
Eisbären Berlin players
German ice hockey left wingers
Thomas Sabo Ice Tigers players
People from Heilbronn (district)
Sportspeople from Stuttgart (region)